The Changemaker Award is an annual film award presented by the Toronto International Film Festival in conjunction with the Shawn Mendes Foundation. First presented at the 2020 Toronto International Film Festival, the award is presented to honour films with a strong social message. It is open to both feature and short films.

Winners

References

Changemaker
Awards established in 2020
Shawn Mendes